DWRD (93.9 FM), broadcasting as MOR 93.9 For Life!, was a radio station owned and operated by the ABS-CBN Corporation. Its studios and broadcast facilities are located at the ABS-CBN Compound, Vel-Amor Subd., Brgy. Cabangan, Legazpi, Albay, and its transmitter is located at Mount Bariw, Estanza, Legazpi, Albay.

On May 5, 2020, the station, along with the other My Only Radio stations, went off the air due to the cease and desist order of the National Telecommunications Commission following the ABS-CBN franchise renewal controversy. It currently operates as an online platform.

References

External links

MOR Philippines stations
Radio stations in Legazpi, Albay
Radio stations established in 1995
Radio stations disestablished in 2020
Defunct radio stations in the Philippines